Mark Luijpers (born 5 October 1970) is a Dutch former footballer, who played as a defender. He has previously played as a centre back and as a left back.

During his career, Luijpers predominantly played for Roda JC in the Dutch Eredivisie (sixteen seasons). He also represented MVV, both in the Eredivisie (1997–98) and in the Eerste Divisie (2005–07).

Honours
Roda JC
KNVB Cup: 1996–97, 1999–2000

References

1970 births
Living people
People from Eijsden-Margraten
Dutch footballers
Association football defenders
Roda JC Kerkrade players
MVV Maastricht players
Eredivisie players
Eerste Divisie players
Footballers from Limburg (Netherlands)